Shelley Hesson (born 22 March 1976) is a New Zealand sailor. She competed at the 2004 Summer Olympics in Athens, in the women's 470 class.

References

1976 births
Living people
New Zealand female sailors (sport)
Olympic sailors of New Zealand
Sailors at the 2004 Summer Olympics – 470